Ashot III Bagratuni also known as Ashot the Blind (c. 690 – 762) was a member of the Bagratuni family who was presiding prince of Armenia as ishkhan from 732 to 748. He was the nephew of Smbat VI Bagratuni.

He won the favour of the Umayyad Caliphate by defeating one of the emirs who had revolted against Damascus and attacked Armenia. His ascension signaled the coming to power of the Bagratids. He was blinded by the rival nobles of the Mamikonian clan. The new power of Armenia had reached such a level that the country, at short notice, could summon an army of 90,000 men, ready to be sent out to battle.

He had two sons, Smbat VII Bagratuni and Vasak Bagratuni.

External links
  Ashot III Bagratuni's Descent

690s births
762 deaths
8th-century kings of Armenia
Bagratuni dynasty
8th-century rulers in Asia
Blind royalty and nobility
Governors of the Umayyad Caliphate
8th-century Armenian people
Princes of Armenia